Caryocolum petrophila is a moth of the family Gelechiidae. It is found in France, Italy, Austria, Switzerland, Estonia, Scandinavia, North Macedonia and Russia. It is also found in Turkey.

The length of the forewings is 5–6 mm for males and about 5 mm for females. The forewings are whitish, mottled with grey brown and with scattered orange-brown scales. Adults have been recorded on wing from June to mid-September.

The larvae feed on Cerastium arvense and Stellaria graminea. Young larvae mine the leaves of their host plant. The mine has the form of a broad corridor in one half of the leaf and running towards the leaf tip. Most frass is ejected out of the mine. Older larvae live free among spun shoot tips in the spun inflorescence and feed on the flowers. Larvae can be found from May to June.

References

Moths described in 1914
petrophila
Moths of Europe
Moths of Asia